Kiryat Shmuel (Hebrew: קריית שמואל) is a neighborhood in central West Jerusalem founded in 1926. It is named for Rabbi Shmuel Salant, the Ashkenazi Chief Rabbi of Jerusalem in 1878-1909. Kiryat Shmuel is located between Rehavia and Katamon.

History
The land was purchased with money from a charitable fund established in honor of the rabbi's ninetieth birthday which also provided loans for building homes. The regulations of the society stipulated that the members be at least eighteen years of age, and that they conduct themselves "in accordance with the Torah, both the written and the orally transmitted."

Kiryat Shmuel was dedicated on May 8, 1929, in the presence of the Ashkenazi chief rabbi, Rabbi Abraham Isaac Kook. Three months later, many properties were damaged in the Arab rioting that erupted in Jerusalem. Forty houses were built by the beginning of World War II, and another ten were completed by the 1948 Israeli-Arab War.

Landmarks

Beit Kadima

St Anthony Monastery/British tribunal

The imposing building across from the President's House in Kiryat Shmuel is the St Anthony Monastery, designed in 1936 by the Italian architect Antonio Barluzzi as a Franciscan school for Arab girls, or Collegio Sant'Antonio in Italian. When World War II broke out, the British Mandatory authorities confiscated the building as enemy property. It was fortified and turned into the Supreme Military Tribunal of the British Mandate. Members of the Lehi and Etzel Jewish underground were tried here, and some were sentenced to death.

See also
Architecture in Israel
1929 Palestine riots

References

External links

Neighbourhoods of Jerusalem
Late modern history of Jerusalem